This is a list of notable alumni, faculty and current students of the American Los Angeles Unified School District, located in Los Angeles, California.

Notable alumni

Academia, science and technology
 Vint Cerf, computer scientist, one of the "fathers of the Internet"
 Walt Cunningham, astronaut
John McCarthy (1927–2011), computer technology, "father of artificial intelligence" 
 Glenn T. Seaborg, nuclear chemistry, Nobel Laureate

Arts and literature
 Ray Bradbury, author
 Helen Gurley Brown, author, publisher, and businesswoman who founded Cosmopolitan magazine
 James Ellroy, writer
Craig Ellwood (1922–1992), architect
Murray Fromson, CBS News correspondent and USC professor
 Edith Head (1897–1981), Academy Award-winning costume designer
 Karl Hubenthal (1917–1998), cartoonist 
 Adela Rogers St. Johns (1894–1988), journalist, novelist, and screenwriter
Jack Smith (1916–1996), columnist, journalist
 Irving Stone, writer

Film, television, and theatre
 Byron Allen, talk show host
 Carol Burnett, comedian
Adam Carolla, comedian
Richard Crenna (1926–2003), actor
 Leonardo DiCaprio, actor 
Micky Dolenz, actor/musician/drummer of The Monkees
 Nanette Fabray, actor
Mike Frankovich (1909–1992), film producer
Joel Grey née Joel David Katz (1950), singer and actor
Rita Hayworth née Margarita Carmen Cansino, actress
 Carole Lombard, actress
 Quinn Martin, producer
Ricardo Montalbán (1920–2009), actor
 David Nelson, actor
 Ricky Nelson, actor
Anthony Quinn (1915–2001), actor
 Robert Redford, actor
Mort Sahl, humorist
Tom Selleck, actor
Coy Watson, Jr. (1912–2009), child actor, Hollywood Walk of Fame, the Watson Family
Delmar Watson (1926–2008), actor, photo-journalist, Hollywood Walk of Fame, the Watson Family
Harry R. Watson (1921–2001), actor, photo-journalist, Hollywood Walk of Fame, the Watson Family
Jack Webb (1920–1982), producer, director, actor
 Robert Young, actor
Regina King, actress, director, Academy Award winner

Music
 Steven Adler, musician, drummer (Guns N' Roses)
 Herb Alpert, musician, music industry executive
 Michael "Flea" Balzary, musician, bassist, trumpet player (Red Hot Chili Peppers)
Odetta Holmes (1930–2008), folk singer, activist 
 Stan Kenton (1911–1979), pianist, composer, and arranger
 Jerome "Jerry" Leiber (1933–2011), lyricist of Jerry Leiber and Mike Stoller
 Phil Spector, record producer
 Mike Stoller, music of Jerry Leiber and Mike Stoller
 Michael Tilson Thomas, conductor, pianist and composer
O'Shea "Ice Cube" Jackson, rapper, director, actor, producer, and founder of the Big Three Basketball league
 Roger Wagner, choral musician, administrator and educator

Athletics

Garret Anderson, former MLB player with the Los Angeles Angels, Atlanta Braves and Los Angeles Dodgers
Gilbert Arenas, professional basketball player, NBA All-Star with Washington Wizards
Ron Botchan, NFL official
Anthony Davis, USC star running back and later pro football player in the NFL and Canadian Football leagues
 Oscar De La Hoya, former world champion and gold medal-winning boxer and founder of Golden Boy Promotions
 Don Drysdale,(1936-1993) National Baseball Hall of Fame pitcher
Jordan Farmar, NBA basketball player 
 Jeff Fisher, former NFL player and head coach
 Gail Goodrich, basketball player in the NBA, attended UCLA
Luis (Lou) Gomez, MLB player
 Mike Haynes, NFL Hall of Famer
Robert Lyles, NFL player
Gary Matthews, former Major League Baseball player
 Dick Moje, National Football League 
 Jim E. Mora, football coach
 Eddie Murray, Baseball Hall of Famer
 Bobby Riggs (1918–1995), tennis player 
Charles White, football player, Heisman Trophy winner
Ozzie Smith, Baseball Hall of Famer
 Mal Whitfield, athlete

Medicine
 David Ho, AIDS researcher, physician and Time magazine's 1996 Man of the Year
 Sammy Lee, MD, Olympic gold medalist in diving
 Norman Topping (1908–1997), MD, president of the University of Southern California

Business and law

Lee Baca, Sheriff of Los Angeles County, 1998–2014
 Warren Christopher, U.S. Secretary of State
 Jimmy Doolittle, aviation pioneer
Daryl F. Gates, Los Angeles Police Chief, 1978 to 1992
 Carlos R. Moreno, California Supreme Court Justice (Cl. of 1966)
 Dorothy Wright Nelson, United States federal judge
 Harry Pregerson, a judge on the United States Court of Appeals for the Ninth Circuit
 Manuel Lawrence Real, a judge of the U.S. District Court for the Central District of California
 Henry Samueli, co-founder of Broadcom

Politics and Government

 Howard Berman, Former U.S. Representative
 Tom Bradley (1917–1998), Mayor of Los Angeles
 Ralph Bunche, educator, UN mediator on Palestine and Nobel Peace Prize Winner 
 Vickie Castro, Activist and member of the LAUSD School Board
 James Charles Corman (1920–2000), Congressman
 Ron Downing, City Manager; UCLA and Harvard University
 Kenneth Hahn (1920–1997), member of the Los Angeles County Board of Supervisors
 Jane L. Harman, U.S. House of Representatives
 Augustus F. Hawkins,  U.S. House of Representatives from California's 21st and 29th district from 1963–1991; California assembly from 1935–1963
 Jack Kemp, politician and professional football player
Glenard P. Lipscomb (1915–1970), Congressman
 Howard McKeon, U.S. House of Representatives from the 25th District (1993-2015)(
Louis R. Nowell (1915–2000), Los Angeles City Council member, 1963–77
 Edward R. Roybal, (1917-2005) member of the U.S. House of Representatives(1963-93)
 Vincent Thomas (1907–1980), California Assemblyman
 Antonio Villaraigosa, 41st Mayor of Los Angeles

Miscellaneous
Patrick Argüello (1943–1970), US-Nicaraguan national killed in the attempted hijack of an El Al flight, as carried out by the PFLP
Al Michaels, Television sportscaster

Notable faculty
 Salvador B. Castro (1933–2013), Mexican-American educator and activist
 Jaime Escalante, (1930-2010) educator
 Jim Tunney, principal and NFL official
 Fay Allen, first African-American woman to be elected to the Los Angeles Unified School District board.

See also
 List of people from Los Angeles

References

Los Angeles Unified School District people
Los Angeles Unified School District people